Giuseppe Botero (Novara, Province of Novara, Italy, 1815 – northern Italy, May 30, 1885), was an Italian writer in various literary genres, representative of the romantic literary movement and also an educator.

Biography

Botero lived his childhood under the custody of his mother, because his father, a surgeon by profession, died when Giuseppe was just a baby. He shared the early years of his life together with his two brothers and two sisters. At an early age, he was sent to an educational institution, never able to see his family again, but with the satisfaction of being successful in his school life.

He devoted himself to being an educator for much of his life, serving as principal in high schools and lyceums in various cities in northern Italy. He completed his Bachelor of Literature studies at the University of Turin.

In March 1848, during a short military career, he crossed the Ticino river carrying a rifle on his shoulder, from the Italian Piedmont and towards Austrian territory, supporting the insurgents of Milan, under the leadership of King Charles Albert of Savoy.

A year after finishing his military career, he entered the world of teaching. He stood out for demonstrating a great passion for teaching, imparting knowledge to his students with patience and dedication, always correcting them to contribute to the development of good Christians and citizens.

During his years of activity as an educator, this Piedmontese combined that activity with the production of literary works in different genres. In the educational field, he was known for being a person dedicated to the formation of his young students in values and different academic facets. In the literary field, he was characterized by composing works where he expressed his affectionate and delicate character, especially in the parables he composed. In this genre, he made writings of an educational nature, following the example of La Mennais and Lessing.

Literary career

Among the literary works authored by him, he wrote some novels. He also wrote numerous apologues, speeches, parables, and stories.

The parables are a class of writings that were used in times before Botero's life, to provide teachings to the people in general, but in a very limited way in Italy. During his lifetime, very few authors used them as a literary genre of writing.

One of his works was the novel Ricciarda oi Nurra ei Cabras  (Ricciarda or the Nurra and the Cabras), which refers to the frequent theme of love between young people belonging to families that hate each other, which Sardinian novelists like very much. The events of this story take place on the island of Sardinia, specifically between the end of the 14th century and the beginning of the 15th century. However, due to its theme, its development could perfectly correspond to the environment lived on the island during all the centuries of modern times.

Botero's purpose through this literary work was to show the serious damage that passions, even good ones, can cause to human beings, if they do not govern their actions through the use of reason, also relying on the bases of a good education.

Main literary works

Career as an educator

In 1849, he was assigned the chair of Italian literature, teaching at the high school of Cortemilia.

Later, he was director in other high schools, including the Lyceum of Lecce, the Lyceum of Faenza, the Lyceum of Pistoya, the Lyceum of Campobasso and the Torricelli Lyceum, the latter being also located in the city of Faenza, in the region of Emilia-Romagna.

From 1850 to 1854, he lived in the city of Cagliari, where he was a teacher at the Dettori Lyceum. There, he wrote some of his literary works, on Sardinian themes and of a historical-descriptive type, in the line of writing of the author Walter Scott.

Presidency of the Torricelli Lyceum

On February 20, 1869, Giuseppe Botero assumed the position of president of the Torricelli Lyceum, one of the oldest and most traditional secondary schools in Italy, located in the city of Faenza, in the province of Ravenna. He received the position from Valentino Cigliutti.

From 1865 and until 1874 - during a large part of Botero's period as president of the institute, one of the most important events in the history of the lyceum was held:  the Annual Literary Festival, through which each year the institute paid homage to an Italian writer of the past, with the active participation of the students of the educational establishment through different disciplines and cultural expressions.

Another important event for the lyceum during Botero's presidency was the return of the institution in 1873 to its former headquarters in the Jesuit convent, in the same city of Faenza. The convent facilities were duly remodeled and prepared to accommodate the educational staff and their students.

Giuseppe Botero assumed the position of president of the lyceum (later renamed Torricelli-Ballardini) until 1875, before being replaced by Francesco Brizio.

On May 30, 1885, Botero died in Italian territory, 10 years after finishing his work as a teacher at the Torricelli Lyceum and after a 30-year career as a writer and 26 years as a licensed educator.

See also 
 Sardinian literature
 Romanticism
 Botero. Italian surname

External links
 Authority control: International Standard Name Identifier 
 Torricelli Lyceum - First centenary of its foundation, Faenza, Italy (1963).

References

Italian writers
Italian educators
1815 births
1885 deaths
19th-century Italian novelists
19th-century Italian educators
Italian short story writers
Italian male short story writers